Still Water is a 2011 outdoor bronze sculpture of a horse's head by Nic Fiddian-Green, located at Marble Arch in London, United Kingdom.

The  piece was commissioned to replace an earlier and similar, but slightly smaller, work, Horse at Water XV. This was installed at the same site temporarily, but then moved to Daylesford, Gloucestershire, the home of Sir Anthony and Lady Carole Bamford, who had commissioned it.

In 2012, Fiddian-Green cleaned the sculpture himself, using a cherry picker.

Trivia
In 2020, Syria installed a similar sculpture in Rawda Square, Damascus.

In the center of At-Bashy village in Kyrgyzstan the small copy is located by local community as the name of the At-Bashy village is literally translated as “horse’s head” in one of the versions.

References

External links
 
 Still Water at NicFiddianGreen.com
 What to see near Marble Arch: a guide to London by tube (2013), The Guardian

2011 establishments in the United Kingdom
2011 sculptures
Animal sculptures in the United Kingdom
Bronze sculptures in the United Kingdom
Horses in art
Outdoor sculptures in London
City of Westminster